Nicocreon (Greek Nικoκρέων; lived 4th century BC) was king of Salamis in Cyprus, at the time of Alexander the Great's (336–323 BC) expedition against Persia. 

Nicocreon submitted to the conqueror along with the other Cypriot kings, without opposition. In 331 BC, after the return of Alexander from Egypt, Nicocreon visited the city of Tyre to pay homage to him, where he distinguished himself by the magnificence which he displayed in furnishing his theatrical exhibitions. 

After the death of Alexander, Nicocreon allied with Ptolemy against Antigonus, and in 315 BC, he colluded with Seleucus and Menelaus, two of Ptolemy's generals, in neutralizing the Cypriot city-kingdoms which had supported Antigonus. In return for these services, Ptolemy awarded him personal command of Citium, Lapithos, Keryneia, and Marion, in addition to retaining Salamis.  He was also entrusted with the chief command over the whole island of Cyprus. 

Nothing is known of the fortunes of Nicocreon after this. As there is no mention of his name during the memorable siege of Salamis by Demetrius Poliorcetes (306 BC), or the great sea-fight that followed it, it seems probable that he must have died before those events. One personal anecdote recorded about Nicocreon is his putting to death in a barbarous manner the philosopher Anaxarchus in revenge for an insult which the latter had offered him on the occasion of his visit to Alexander.

References
Smith, William (editor); Dictionary of Greek and Roman Biography and Mythology, "Nicocreon (1)", Boston, (1867)

Notes

Ancient Greek rulers
Kings of Salamis, Cyprus
4th-century BC Greek people
Year of birth unknown
Year of death unknown
People associated with Alexander the Great